Cort MBC-1 is the signature guitar of Matthew Bellamy, lead singer and guitarist of the English rock band Muse, launched in 2015 in Indonesia.

History

Design and varieties 

Guitar has solid Telecaster-form body made from tilia, maple neck and rosewood fingerboard with compound radius.

Modifications of Cort MBC-1:
 MBC-1 MBLK — Matt Black colour.
 MBC-1 RS — Red Sparkle colour.
 MBC-1 LH — Matt black version for left-handed people.
 MBC-1 Matt White Show Special Stormtrooper Edition.

Manson Guitar Works are proposing modernization of guitar
 upgrade with Sustaiac Pro sustainer;
 installing Z.Vex Fuzz Factory;
 replacement of hardware; 
 replacement of machineheads and control knobs.

Awards and nominations 
This guitar was nominated on Music and Sound Awards and MIA Awards, as  «Best electric guitar» and «Electric guitar of the year», and won the last one. Besides, it was marked as "Premier Gear" by Premier Guitar, magazine Total Guitar called it «Best buy» (5/5).

 |-
 |2015
 |Cort MBC-1
 |Best Electric Guitar
 |Music and Sound Awards
 | 
 |
 |
 |-
 |2015
 |Cort MBC-1
 |Electric Guitar of the Year
 |Music Industries Association Award
 |
 |
 |

References

Sources

External links 

 About guitar on official Cort website
 About guitar on official Manson Guitar Works website
 
 Review Cort MBC-1 from Total Guitar
 Review Cort MBC-1 from Guitar World
 Review 
 Article on MuseWiki 

Electric guitars